SOIUSA code is the code used in the International Standardized Mountain Subdivision of the Alps (ISMSA or SOIUSA), a proposal by Italian Alpinist, Sergio Marazzi, to re-categorize the mountains and mountain ranges of the Alps. The proposal has been aired since 2005 but has yet to receive official recognition.

SOIUSA groups' hierarchy

SOIUSA divides the Alps in two main regions, the Western Alps and Eastern Alps.
These two main regions are further divided in: 
5 major sectors (SR);
36 sections (SZ);
132 subsections (STS);
333 supergroups (SPG);
870 groups (GR);
1625 subgroups (STG).

Using this system, any Alpine mountain can be given a code which shows which region, sector, section, subsection, supergroup, group and subgroup it belongs to.

Encoding
SOIUSA code is built in the following way:
 2 main parts:
 Western Alps are identified by roman numeral I;
 Eastern Alps are identified by roman numeral II;
 5 major sectors:
 in Western Alps:
 South-western Alps are identified by upper-case letter A;
 North-western Alps are identified by upper-case letter B;
 in Eastern Alps:
 Central Eastern Alps are identified by upper-case letter A;
 Northern Limestone Alps are identified by upper-case letter B;
 Southern Limestone Alps are identified by lower-case letter C;
 36 sections: identified by numbers from 1 to 36 starting from Ligurian Alps and ending with Slovenian prealps;
 132 subsections: identified in their own section  by the roman numerals needed to count every subsection;
 333 supergroups: identified in their own subsection by all the upper-case letters needed to count every supergroup;
 870 groups: identified in their own  supergroup by all the numbers needed to count every group;
 1625 subgroups: identified in their own group by all the lower-case letters needed to count every subgroup.

roman numeral (I or II) / upper-case letter (A, B or C) - number from 1 to 36 . roman numeral - upper-case letter . number . lower-case letter

In some case the final lower-case letter can be missing because some group is not divided into subgroups. 
It can seldom happen (i.e.:Monte Tagliaferro) that a subgroup too is further divided in sectors; in that case the last lower-case letter is followed by a slash (/) and a second lower-case letter.

Encoding example

Pointe Sommeiller (Fr) / Punta Sommeiller (It) code is:

 I/A-4.III-B.6.b

It can be decoded in the following way:
 I: the mountain belongs to Western Alps,
 A: the mountain belongs to South Western Alps,
 4: the mountain belongs to Cottian Alps,
 III: the mountain belongs to Northern Cottian Alps (which are the third out of three subsections belonging to Cottian Alps),
 B: the mountain belongs to chaîne Bernaude-Pierre Menue-Ambin (Fr) / catena Bernauda-Pierre Menue-Ambin (It) (which is the second out of two supergroups belonging to Northern Cottian Alps),
 6: the mountain belongs to groupe d'Ambin (Fr) / gruppo d'Ambin (It) (which is the sixth out of six groups belonging to Bernaude-Pierre Menue-Ambin supergroup),
 b: the mountain belongs to a subgroup called crête Sommeiller-Vallonetto (Fr) / sottogruppo Sommeiller-Vallonetto (It)  (which is the second out of three subgroups belonging to Ambin group).

References
 

Alps
Encodings